Niklas Hörber (born 14 May 1991) is a German former professional footballer who played as a forward.

References

External links
 
 

1991 births
Living people
People from Nürnberger Land
Sportspeople from Middle Franconia
German footballers
Footballers from Bavaria
Association football forwards
Germany youth international footballers
1. FC Nürnberg II players
SV Werder Bremen II players
SpVgg Bayern Hof players
3. Liga players
Regionalliga players
21st-century German people